Simonetta Perkins is a 1925 novella by the British writer L. P. Hartley. A young Bostonian woman visiting Venice with her overbearing mother quickly tires of her fellow American tourists and begins to fixate on a handsome gondolier.

References

Bibliography
  Wright, Adrian. Foreign Country: The Life of L.P. Hartley. I. B. Tauris, 2001.

1925 British novels
Novels by L. P. Hartley
Novels set in Venice
G. P. Putnam's Sons books